In reptiles, the sublabial scales, also called lower-labials or infralabials, are those scales that border the mouth opening along the lower jaw. They do not include the median scale (mental scale). The term labial originates from labium (Latin for "lip"), which refers to any lip-like structure. The numbers of these scales present, and sometimes the shapes and sizes, are some of many characteristics used to differentiate species from one another.

Related scales

 Supralabial scales
 Rostral scale
 Mental scale

See also
 Labial scales
 Snake scales
 Anatomical terms of location

References

Snake scales